Martin County Schools may refer to:

 Martin County School District (Florida)
 Martin County School System (Kentucky)
 Martin County Schools (North Carolina)